Slotsarkaderne (usually styled SlotsArkaderne) is a shopping centre located in Hillerød, Denmark.

History
Slotsarkaderne was built in 1991–92 to design by Ulrik Plesner. In 2014, Danica published plans to undertake another extension.

Today
Slotsarkederne is owned by Danica Ejendomme and is managed by DEAS. It has an area of 24,000 square metres and contains 60 shops.

References

External links
 Slotsarkaderne

Shopping centres in Denmark
Shopping malls established in 1992
1992 establishments in Denmark
Hillerød